Eleanor Lausch Dietrich (Brooklyn, NY, July 30, 1912 – Island Park, NY, May 4, 2001) was an American operatic soprano. She was active at the Vienna Volksoper and the Bayreuth Festival during the 1940s.

References

1912 births
2001 deaths
American operatic sopranos
20th-century American women opera singers
Musicians from Brooklyn
Classical musicians from New York (state)